Alireza Pourmand (born 21 June 1970 in Isfahan, Iran) is an Iranian football coach and retired player who currently serves as assistant manager at Saba Qom. He also managed Gahar after the resignation of Mehdi Tartar.

References

1970 births
Living people
Iranian footballers
Iranian football managers
Persian Gulf Pro League players
Association football midfielders